The Taxation of Colonies Act 1778 was an Act of the Parliament of Great Britain under the order King George III that declared Parliament would not impose any duty, tax, or assessment for the raising of revenue in any of the colonies of British America or the British West Indies. The Act, passed during the American Revolutionary War, was an attempt by Parliament to end the war by conceding one of the early points of dispute.

Parliament's effort to tax the colonies without the consent of the colonists, especially as enacted in the Townshend Acts of 1767 and the Tea Act of 1773, had been a major cause of the American Revolution. This act noted that those taxes had "been found by experience to occasion great uneasiness and disorders" and that his Majesty desired "to restore the peace and welfare of all his Majesty's Dominions".

The Act declared that Parliament would not impose any duty, tax, or assessment for the raising of revenue in any of the colonies. Parliament would only impose such duties as expedient to regulate commerce and the net income from these duties would be given to the colonies. In making this concession, Parliament was taking the position that American colonists had advocated a decade earlier, most notably John Dickinson in his 1767 and 1768 "Letters from a Farmer in Pennsylvania".

By the time the statute was enacted, it was too late to have any effect on the war: the dispute was no longer specifically about taxation, and the colonies had already declared independence. Additionally, according to legal historian John Phillip Reid, "As a matter of constitutional law the statute was meaningless", because future Parliaments would not be bound by the current Parliament's pledge not to impose taxes.

The Act was eventually repealed by the Statute Law (Repeals) Act 1973 as obsolete.

References 

Great Britain Acts of Parliament 1778
British laws relating to the American Revolution
Tax legislation in the United Kingdom
Repealed Great Britain Acts of Parliament